49 Andromedae (abbreviated 49 And) is a star in the constellation Andromeda. 49 Andromedae is the Flamsteed designation though it also bears the Bayer designation A Andromedae. It is visible to the naked eye under good viewing conditions with an apparent visual magnitude of 5.269. It is moving closer to the Sun with a heliocentric radial velocity of −11.5 km/s.

With an estimated age of  years, this is an aging red-clump giant star with a stellar classification of K0 III, indicating it is generating energy by helium fusion at its core. The spectrum displays "slightly strong" absorption lines of cyanogen (CN). It has 2.07 times the mass of the Sun and has expanded to 11 times the Sun's radius.

References

K-type giants
Horizontal-branch stars
Andromeda (constellation)
Andromedae, A
BD+46 0370
Andromedae, 49
009057
006999
0430